Maggie O'Connor is a Grammy-winning violinist. She graduated from the Peabody Conservatory in 2014. As a member of the O'Connor Band, she performed for the 59th Grammy Awards in 2017.

Musical career 
Maggie has had classical training as well as traditional music training. She is an accomplished performing musician.

Awards and honors 
Maggie won a Grammy in 2017 for her performance on the Coming Home (O'Connor Band album) along with her spouse and family in the O'Connor Band.

Discography

Albums 
Duo

References

American bluegrass fiddlers
American folk musicians
American women country singers
American country singer-songwriters
American country fiddlers
Grammy Award winners
Living people
21st-century American violinists
20th-century American musicians
Year of birth missing (living people)
20th-century American women musicians
21st-century American women